Olli Isoaho (born 2 March 1956) is a Finnish former professional footballer who played as a goalkeeper. He competed in the men's tournament at the 1980 Summer Olympics.

Career
Isoaho joined Bundesliga side Arminia Bielefeld in summer 1982. On 6 November 1982, he played in Bielefeld's 11–1 loss to Borussia Dortmund, conceding ten goals in the second half. He made 15 appearances for the club.

References

External links
 

1956 births
Living people
Arminia Bielefeld players
Association football goalkeepers
Finland international footballers
Finnish footballers
Bundesliga players
FC Kontu players
Footballers at the 1980 Summer Olympics
Helsingin Jalkapalloklubi players
Moss FK players
Olympic footballers of Finland
People from Kerava
Seiko SA players
Västerås SK Fotboll players
Sportspeople from Uusimaa